Kim Do-wan (born 8 March 1995) is a South Korean actor. He is best known for his roles in Start-Up (2020) and My Roommate Is a Gumiho (2021).

Filmography

Film

Television series

Web series

Music video appearances

References

External links 
 

 

1995 births
Living people
21st-century South Korean male actors
South Korean male television actors
South Korean male film actors
South Korean male web series actors